Calcium silicate is the chemical compound Ca2SiO4, also known as calcium orthosilicate and is sometimes formulated as 2CaO·SiO2. It is also referred to by the shortened trade name Cal-Sil or Calsil. It occurs naturally as the mineral larnite.

Properties

Calcium silicate is a white free-flowing powder. It can be derived from naturally occurring limestone and diatomaceous earth, a siliceous sedimentary rock. It is one of a group of compounds that can be produced by reacting calcium oxide and silica in various ratios e.g. 3CaO·SiO2, alite (Ca3SiO5); 2CaO·SiO2, (Ca2SiO4); 3CaO·2SiO2, (Ca3SiO7); and CaO·SiO2, wollastonite (CaSiO3).  It has a low bulk density and high physical water absorption.

Use
Calcium silicate is used as an anticaking agent in food preparation, including table salt and as an antacid. It is approved by the United Nations' FAO and WHO bodies as a safe food additive in a large variety of products. It has the E number reference E552.

High-temperature insulation

Calcium silicate is commonly used as a safe alternative to asbestos for high-temperature insulation materials. Industrial-grade piping and equipment insulation is often fabricated from calcium silicate. Its fabrication is a routine part of the curriculum for insulation apprentices. Calcium silicate competes in these realms against rockwool and proprietary insulation solids, such as perlite mixture and vermiculite bonded with sodium silicate.  Although it is popularly considered an asbestos substitute, early uses of calcium silicate for insulation still made use of asbestos fibers.

Passive fire protection

It is used in passive fire protection and fireproofing as calcium silicate brick or in roof tiles. It is one of the most successful materials in fireproofing in Europe because of regulations and fire safety guidelines for commercial and residential building codes. Where North Americans use spray fireproofing plasters, Europeans are more likely to use cladding made of calcium silicate.  High-performance calcium-silicate boards retain their excellent dimensional stability even in damp and humid conditions and can be installed at an early stage in the construction program, before wet trades are completed and the building is weather-tight. For sub-standard products, silicone-treated sheets are available to fabricators to mitigate potential harm from high humidity or general presence of water. Fabricators and installers of calcium silicate in passive fire protection often also install firestops.

While the best possible reaction to fire classifications are A1 (construction applications) and A1Fl (flooring applications) respectively, both of which mean "non-combustible" according to EN 13501-1: 2007, as classified by a notified laboratory in Europe, some calcium-silicate boards only come with fire classification of A2 (limited combustibility) or even lower classifications (or no classification), if they are tested at all.

Acid mine drainage remediation
Calcium silicate, also known as slag, is produced when molten iron is made from iron ore, silicon dioxide and calcium carbonate in a blast furnace. When this material is processed into a highly refined, re-purposed calcium silicate aggregate, it is used in the remediation of acid mine drainage (AMD) on active and passive mine sites. 
Calcium silicate neutralizes active acidity in AMD systems by removing free hydrogen ions from the bulk solution, thereby increasing pH. As its silicate anion captures H+ ions (raising the pH), it forms monosilicic acid (H4SiO4), a neutral solute. Monosilicic acid remains in the bulk solution to play other important roles in correcting the adverse effects of acidic conditions. As opposed to limestone (a popular remediation material), calcium silicate effectively precipitates heavy metals and does not armor over, prolonging its effectiveness in AMD systems.

As a product of sealants
It is used as a sealant in roads or on the shells of fresh eggs: when sodium silicate is applied as a sealant to cured concrete or egg shells, it chemically reacts with calcium hydroxide or calcium carbonate to form calcium silicate hydrate, sealing micropores with a relatively impermeable material.

As a component of cement
It also occurs in cements, where it is known as belite or in cement chemist notation C2S.

Agriculture
Calcium silicate is often used in agriculture as a plant available source of silicon. It is "applied extensively to Everglades mucks and associated sands planted to sugarcane and rice"

See also

References

Inorganic silicon compounds
Calcium compounds
Antacids
Silicates
E-number additives